Eva Ramm (born 23 November 1925) is a Norwegian psychologist, essayist, novelist and children's writer. She was born in Bergen. She made her literary debut in 1958 with the novel "Med støv på hjernen". The novel was translated into several languages, and was basis for the very successful film "Støv på hjernen" in 1959, as well as a Danish remake from 1961. She has written 22 books. Among them are "Engel på vidvanke" from 1962, "Kvinnekall og mannefall" 1965, "Noe må gjøres" (for young people) 1968, "Mors tre hoder" from 1973, "Ærlig talt" (for young people) 1975. She advocated the theory of a plural ego in her book "Det  plurale jeg. Normalt å være spaltet?" in 1995. "Kjære Sokrates" is written in 1981, and "Elskeren Jeshua" in 1985. She has also written other books on religion and psychiatry, like "Fra tro til virkelighet" 1976, "Psykiatri til å bli gal av" 2002, "Livssyn uten religion" 2008. Among her crime novels are "Skynd deg, min elskede 1986" and "Mord i prestens hage" 1992.  She edited the magazine Sykepleien from 1973 to 1977.

Member of Norwegian PEN. Member of NBU, and leader 1971-1973. Member DnF from 1965. Local politician in Nesodden 1957-1971 with many offices. Specialist psychologist from 1983. Private praxis from 1988.

References

1925 births
Living people
People from Bergen in health professions
Norwegian psychologists
Norwegian women psychologists
20th-century Norwegian women writers
20th-century Norwegian novelists
Norwegian crime fiction writers
Norwegian essayists
Norwegian women essayists
Norwegian magazine editors
Norwegian women editors
20th-century essayists